Catocala giuditta is a moth in the family Erebidae first described by Schawerda in 1934. It is found in Algeria.

References

giuditta
Moths described in 1934
Moths of Africa